The 2012–2013 season was AFC Wimbledon's second season in the Football League. It also marked the 10th anniversary since AFC Wimbledon's formation in 2002.

League table

Results summary

Match results

Pre-season Friendlies

League Two 2012–13

August

September

October

November

December

January

February

March

April

FA Cup 2012–13

Football League Cup 2012–13

Football League Trophy 2012–13

Squad statistics

Appearances and goals

|-
|colspan="14"|Players who played on loan for AFC Wimbledon but subsequently returned to their parent club:

|-
|colspan="15"|Players who played for AFC Wimbledon but were subsequently released or sold by the club:

|}

Top scorers

*Including own goals by opposition.

Disciplinary Record

Transfers

References 

2012–13
AFC Wimbledon
AFC Wimbledon season
AFC Wimbledon season